Fluvioviridavis is an extinct genus of bird from the Early Eocene Green River Formation of Wyoming. There is only one known species, F. platyrhamphus.

References

Eocene birds
Fossil taxa described in 2001
Paleogene birds of North America